Mhadjou Youssouf (born 5 June 1990) is a Comorian sprinter who specializes in the 100 metres.

He competed at the 2008 World Junior Championships and the 2008 Olympic Games without progressing to the second round.

His personal best time is 10.62 seconds, achieved in the 2008 Olympic heat in Beijing.

He represented his country in the 100 m at the 2009 World Championships in Athletics.

References

External links
 

1990 births
Living people
Comorian male sprinters
Athletes (track and field) at the 2008 Summer Olympics
Olympic athletes of the Comoros
World Athletics Championships athletes for the Comoros